During the 1999–2000 season, Tottenham Hotspur participated in the FA Premier League.

Season summary
Tottenham Hotspur failed to make much of an impact on their return to Europe after an eight-year exile, nor were their cup exploits particularly impressive. Tenth place in the final table was a long way short of the top-five finishes attained by local rivals Arsenal and Chelsea, and manager George Graham bolstered his ranks for the 2000-01 season by paying a club record fee for Ukrainian striker Serhii Rebrov.

Final league table

Results summary

Results by matchday

Results
Tottenham Hotspur's score comes first

Legend

FA Premier League

FA Cup

League Cup

UEFA Cup

First-team squad
Squad at end of season

Left club during season

Reserve squad
The following players did not appear for the first team this season.

Transfers

In

Out

Transfers in:  £10,450,000
Transfers out:  £1,815,000
Total spending:  £8,635,000

Statistics

Appearances and goals
Appearances as of end of season

|-
! colspan=14 style=background:#dcdcdc; text-align:center| Goalkeepers

|-
! colspan=14 style=background:#dcdcdc; text-align:center| Defenders

|-
! colspan=14 style=background:#dcdcdc; text-align:center| Midfielders

|-
! colspan=14 style=background:#dcdcdc; text-align:center| Forwards

|-
! colspan=14 style=background:#dcdcdc; text-align:center| Players transferred out during the season

Goal scorers 

The list is sorted by shirt number when total goals are equal.

Clean sheets

References

Tottenham Hotspur F.C. seasons
Tottenham Hotspur